The A-League Men Goalkeeper of the Year is an annual soccer award presented to the best goalkeeper in the A-League Men. The award is determined by a panel of experts.

The A-League was founded in 2005 to replace the semi-professional National Soccer League. The number of teams in the league has ranged from eight to twelve and there are currently twelve clubs in the league. The Goalkeeper of the Year award has been given out since the league's inaugural season.

Eugene Galekovic has won the award four times, the most times out of all keepers. Michael Theo is the next-most successful, with three awards.

Winners

Awards won by nationality

Awards won by club

References

General

External links
A-League official website

A-League Men trophies and awards
Australian soccer trophies and awards